Castelândia is a municipality in southwest Goiás state, Brazil.  It is a large producer of sugar cane and soybeans.

Location
Castelândia is located in the southwest of the state, west of the Rio dos Bois, a major tributary of the Paranaíba.  It is 54 kilometers northeast of the regional center, Quirinópolis and 95 kilometers southwest of Rio Verde.  The distance to the state capital, Goiânia, is 282 km.  Highway connections are made by GO-040 / Aragoiânia / Cromínia / Pontalina / Bom Jesus de Goiás / BR-452 / GO-319 / Aloândia. Sepin.  Neighboring municipalities are Rio Verde, Maurilândia, and Bom Jesus de Goiás.

Demographics
Population density in 2007: 11.87 inhabitants/km2
Population growth rate 1996/2007: -0.31.%
Total population in 2007: 3,530
Total population in 1996: 3,653
Urban population in 2007: 3,205
Rural population in 2007: 325

The economy
The economy is based on cattle raising (22,000 head in 2006), poultry production, and growing of sugar cane, corn, and soybeans.  There was 01 financial institution in 2007—BRADESCO S.A

Motor vehicles
Automobiles:  187
Pickup trucks: 38
Number of inhabitants per motor vehicle: 15.6

Main agricultural products in ha.(2006)
rice:        600
sugarcane: 2,600
corn:      3,000
soybeans: 6,000

Farm Data (2006)in ha.
Number of farms:                119
Total area:                  23,793
Area of permanent crops:        n/a
Area of perennial crops:     18,246
Area of natural pasture:     4,212
Persons dependent on farming: 351

Health and education
In 2006 there was 01 hospital with 15 beds.  There were no institutions of higher education.
The infant mortality rate was 20.02 in 2000.
The literacy rate was 80.0 in 2000.
MHDI:  0.732
State ranking:  137 (out of 242 municipalities)
National ranking:  2,379 (out of 5,507 municipalities)

History
Castelândia was created as a district belonging to the municipality of Rio Verde in 1963.  In 1993 it was dismembered from Rio Verde to become its own municipality.

See also
List of municipalities in Goiás
Microregions of Goiás

References

Frigoletto

Municipalities in Goiás